Ait Boubidmane is a town in El Hajeb Province, Fès-Meknès, Morocco. According to the 2004 census it has a population of 4,258.

References

Populated places in El Hajeb Province
Rural communes of Fès-Meknès